There are many Ukrainian-Americans in the United States, including both original immigrants who obtained American citizenship and their American descendants. To be included in this list, the person must have a Wikipedia article showing they are Ukrainian American or must have references showing they are Ukrainian American and are sufficiently notable to merit a Wikipedia article.

Actors and comedians 
Nick Adams – actor, screenwriter 
 Nina Arianda – actress and Tony Award winner
 Anthony Atamanuik – actor and comedian
 Pat Bilon – actor
 Natalie Burn – actress
 Matt Czuchry – actor
Irina Dvorovenko – ballet dancer and actress
 George Dzundza – actor
 Erika Eleniak – actress, father is of Ukrainian descent
 Taissa Farmiga – actress
 Vera Farmiga – actress
 John Hodiak – actor
 Dustin Hoffman – actor, of Jewish descent 
 Milla Jovovich – actress, supermodel and musician; born in Kyiv, to a Serbian father and a Russian mother
 Danny Kaye – actor, of Jewish descent
 Alla Korot – actress
 Kiril Kulish – stage actor, Ukrainian Jewish
 Mila Kunis – actress and voice actress, Ukrainian Jewish
 Oksana Lada – actress, born in western Ukraine
 Laryssa Lauret – Broadway, television, and film actress, of Ukrainian descent
 Olga Lezhneva – actress born in Kharkiv; Ukrainian mother
 Traci Lords – actress born Nora Kuzma; her father was of Ukrainian ancestry
 Walter Matthau – actor, of Jewish descent
 Mike Mazurki – actor
 Boris McGiver – actor
 Alex Meneses – actress
 George Montgomery – actor
 Matthew Montgomery – actor
 Leonard Nimoy – actor, Ukrainian Jewish
 Larisa Oleynik – actress, of Ukrainian descent on her father's side
 Bree Olson – actress and media personality, former pornographic actress
 Kim Ostrenko – theater and movie actress, with significant roles in 16 movies; played Alice Connellan in Dolphin Tale (2011)
 Holly Palance – actress
 Jack Palance – actor
 Sasha Roiz – actor, Ukrainian Jewish
 Lizabeth Scott – actress, second-generation Ukrainian on both sides
 Amy Seimetz – actress
 William Shatner - actor
 Isaac Liev Schreiber - actor
 John Spencer – actor; Ukrainian–American on the maternal side
 Anna Sten – actress
 Michael Stoyanov – actor
 Lusia Strus – actress
 Zoë Wanamaker – actress, played Susan Harper in the television series My Family; father of Ukrainian Jewish extraction
 Jeremy Allen White – actor
 Katheryn Winnick - actress
 Natalie Wood – actress
 Danika Yarosh – actress
 Chris Zylka – actor

Film, Media, Radio, Television 

 Juliya Chernetsky – TV personality
 Edward Dmytryk (1908–1999) – film director who was amongst the Hollywood 10, a group of blacklisted film industry professionals who served time in prison for being in contempt of Congress during the McCarthy-era Red Scare
 Andrea Feczko – TV personality
 James Gray- director, producer and screenwriter, (Two lovers, Ad Astra) Jewish-Ukrainian
 Basil Iwanyk – Hollywood producer, noted for producing films such as, Clash of the Titans, John Wick, We Are Marshall.
 Kim Kamando – radio personality
 Tom Leykis – radio personality
 Taras Maksimuk – YouTuber, created "TechRax" channel focused on destructive testing of technology, 7.6 million subscribers as of October 2022.
 Andrij Parekh – cinematographer
 Matej Silecky - director, professional figure skater
 Steven Spielberg – director, producer and screenwriter, of Jewish descent
 Gene Stupnitsky – writer and producer
 Alex Trebek - Television host
 Kendra Wilkinson – TV personality

Artists and designers 
 Alexander Archipenko – artist, sculptor
 Nudie Cohn – fashion designer, of Jewish descent
 John Eberson - Architect best known for his atmospheric theatre style theatres. His most notable surviving theatres include the Palace Theatre, State Theatre, Majestic Theatre, Orpheum Theatre, Paramount Theatre and Tampa Theatre.
 Paul Himmel – fashion and documentary photographer, of Jewish descent 
 Jacques Hnizdovsky – stylized realist
 Peter Hujar - photographer
 Andrei Kushnir – artist painter
 Abram Molarsky – impressionist painter, of Jewish descent
 Luba Perchyshyn – pysanky maker, teacher, in Minneapolis
 Janet Sobel – artist "drip painting"
 Jim Steranko – graphic artist, comic book writer/artist, historian, magician, publisher and film production illustrator.
 Bill Tytla – original Disney animator

Chess players
Vassily Ivanchuk
Boris Baczynsky
Alexander Onischuk
Sam Palatnik
Stepan Popel
Katerina Rohonyan
Anna Zatonskih

Government and civil servants
 Ruth Bader Ginsburg – United States Supreme Court Justice
 Christopher A. Boyko – US District Court Judge
 Joseph V. Charyk – first Director of the US National Reconnaissance Office
 Lev Dobriansky – professor of economics at Georgetown University and anti-communist advocate, he served as United States Ambassador to the Bahamas from 1982 to 1986
 Paula Dobriansky – American foreign policy expert; has served in key roles as a diplomat and policy maker in the administrations of five U.S. presidents, both Democrat and Republican; specialist in Eastern Europe, the former Soviet Union, and political-military affairs
 Bohdan A. Futey – US Federal Claims Court Judge
 Natalie Jaresko – former Ukrainian Minister of Finance 
 Boris Lushniak – former Acting Surgeon General of the United States
 Julia Mullock – Imperial High Princess of Korea
 Roman Popadiuk – former US Ambassador to Ukraine
 Victoria Spartz – former Indiana state Senator, Member of the U.S. House of Representatives from Indiana's 5th district
 Ulana Suprun – former acting Ukrainian Minister of Healthcare 
 Timothy Tymkovich – US Court of Appeals for the Tenth Circuit, Chief Judge
 Kateryna Yushchenko – former US State Department Official and former First Lady of Ukraine

Engineers and Business 
 Bohdan Bejmuk – aerospace engineer
 Martin Cooper – American inventor, "father of the cell phone", of Jewish descent
 William Dzus – inventor of Dzus turnlock fasteners for aircraft 
 Paul Eremenko – former Google executive 
 Nick Holonyak – inventor of the LED
 Andrew Kay – President and CEO of now defunct Kaypro
 Jan Koum – founder of WhatsApp, of Jewish descent
 Max Levchin – co-founder of PayPal, of Jewish descent
 Daniel Milstein – founder and CEO of Gold Star financial group; author of 17 Cents and a Dream
 Igor Pasternak – CEO of Aeros 
 Michael Pocalyko – investment banker 
 Jay Pritzker – entrepreneur and founder of the Hyatt Hotel chain, of Jewish descent
 Lubomyr Romankiw – inventor; engineer
 Stephen Timoshenko – engineer, reputed to be the father of modern engineering mechanics
 Harold Willens – Jewish businessman, nuclear freeze activist, political donor
 Harry Winston – businessman; jeweler
 Jacob Millman – Professor, Columbia University, Author, Millman's Theorem

Military officers and war heroes 
Jeremy Michael Boorda – US Admiral-Chief of Naval Operations
Myron F. Diduryk – Vietnam War Silver Star recipient
Samuel Jaskilka – General-Assistant Commandant of the US Marine Corps
Nicholas S. H. Krawciw – US Army Major General
Nicholas Minue – World War II Medal of Honor recipient
Nicholas Oresko – World War II Medal of Honor recipient
Alexander Vindman - US Army lieutenant colonel serving as Director for European Affairs for the NSC

Musicians 
Bohdan Andrusyshyn – singer; Ukrainian father
Lydia Artymiw – concert pianist and McKnight professor of piano
Renata Babak – opera singer
Alina Baraz – singer, songwriter, first Ukrainian in her family to be born in America
Leonard Bernstein – composer and conductor who was blacklisted in the 1950s, of Jewish descent
Michael Bolton – pop rock ballad singer and songwriter, of Jewish descent
Neko Case – singer, songwriter, member of The New Pornographers
Maksim Chmerkovskiy – Ukrainian-born dancer and choreographer
Kvitka Cisyk – soprano singer
Andrij Dobriansky – bass-baritone, had the longest career with the Metropolitan Opera of any Ukrainian-born artist
Stanley Drucker – orchestra clarinetist associated with Buffalo Philharmonic Orchestra and New York Philharmonic 
Yelena Dudochkin – soprano
Bob Dylan – singer-songwriter, poet; his Jewish paternal grandparents emigrated from Odessa in the Russian Empire (now Ukraine) to the United States following the anti-Semitic pogroms of 1905
Jackie Evancho – classical crossover singer 
Bill Evans – jazz musician and composer 
Marko Farion - opera singer, bandurist
Anthony Fedorov – singer, finalist on season 4 of American Idol
G-Eazy – songwriter-rapper
Stan Getz - jazz saxophonist and band leader, popularizer of cool and bossa nova sub-genres
Vladimir Horowitz – Jewish Ukrainian pianist; widely regarded as one of the most successful pianists of the 20th century
George Hrab – drummer, singer, songwriter and podcaster; often discusses his Ukrainian heritage on his podcast
Eugene Hütz – musician and actor; lead singer of Gogol Bordello
 George Komsky – solo vocalist
Lenny Kravitz – singer, instrumentalist; the family of his father Sy Kravitz has Ukrainian roots
Julian Kytasty – bandurist, traditional Ukrainian music
Valentina Lisitsa – Ukrainian-born pianist
Matys Brothers – rockabilly musical act
Nathan Milstein - Jewish Ukrainian-born American virtuoso violinist
Peter Ostroushko – violinist and mandolinist
Wally Palmar – musician of The Romantics
Paul Plishka – opera singer
Vyacheslav Polozov – opera singer
Sviatoslav Richter – German Ukrainian pianist; widely regarded as one of the most successful pianists of the 20th century
Dorian Rudnytsky – cellist and composer; son of Maria Sokil; his father is Ukrainian
Melanie Safka – folk singer, performed at Woodstock
Nicole Scherzinger – singer, songwriter and television music competition judge; of Ukrainian descent on her mother's side
Christine Shevchenko – Ukrainian-born ballerina
Maria Sokil – soprano singer
Dimitri Tiomkin -- film composer
Steven Tyler – singer-songwriter, frontman for Aerosmith
Peter Wilhousky – composer, educator and conductor 
Your Old Droog – rapper

Performers 

 Vasyl Avramenko – dancer, choreographer
 David Copperfield – illusionist/magician, of Jewish descent
 Maksim Chmerkovskiy – dancer and choreographer, known for Dancing with the Stars 
 Valentin Chmerkovskiy – dancer and choreographer, known for Dancing with the Stars
 Roma Prima-Bohachevsky – dancer, choreographer and dancer instructor
 Karina Smirnoff – dancer and choreographer, known for Dancing with the Stars
 Christine Shevchenko – ballet dancer
 Igor Youskevitch - ballet dancer

Politicians 
Mary Beck – former Detroit councilwoman and acting Mayor
David E Bonior – former Michigan Congressman and Minority House Whip
Walter Dudycz – former Illinois State Senator
Eliot Engel - New York Congressman
 Mike Enzi – US Senator from Wyoming 
Maurice Hinchey – former New York Congressman (Ukrainian mother)
Martin Howrylak – Michigan State House of Representatives
Stephen J Jarema – former New York State Assemblyman
Gary Johnson – former Governor of New Mexico
Ben Klassen – Republican state legislator, white separatist, and religious leader
Nick Kotik – former Pennsylvania State House of Representatives
Kathy Kozachenko – former councilwoman Ann Arbor, Michigan
Myron Kulas – former Illinois State Assemblyman
Chris Lilik – political activist
Lesia Liss – former Michigan State House of Representatives
Michael Luchkovich – Canada's first Member of Parliament of Ukrainian origin (born in Shamokin, Pennsylvania)
Stephen A. Mikulak – former New Jersey State Assemblyman
Steven Pankow – former Mayor of Buffalo, New York
Kirill Reznik – Maryland State House of Delegates
Bob Schaffer – former Colorado Congressman
Chuck Schumer - senior US senator from New York
John Shostak – former Connecticut State House of Representative
Victoria Spartz – Indiana State Senator 
Arlen Spector – former US Senator from Pennsylvania
Ted Stuban – former Pennsylvania State House of Representatives
Mark Treyger – New York City Councilman
Herman Toll – former Pennsylvania Congressman
Paul Wellstone – former US Senator from Minnesota
Kathleen Willey – major figure in the Monica Lewinsky and Paula Jones scandals; her father was of Ukrainian descent

Religious figures 
 Paul Copan – Christian theologian, analytic philosopher, apologist, author; President of the Evangelical Philosophical Society
 Sergey F. Dezhnyuk—theologian, historian, and political analyst. 
Jim Cymbala – pastor for over 25 years of the 10,000-member Brooklyn Tabernacle church in New York City
Borys Gudziak – reverend and archeparch
Agapius Honcharenko – exiled Orthodox priest
Anton LaVey – author of the Satanic bible
Ivan Volansky – priest who organized the first Greek Catholic parish in the United States

Sports figures 

Orest Banach – German-born soccer goalkeeper
Moe Berg – Major League Baseball catcher and coach
Joel Bolomboy – NBA basketball player
Ivan Borodiak – Argentine-born soccer player
Sasha Chmelevski - NHL ice hockey player
Wayne Chrebet – NFL football player
Jakob Chychrun – NHL hockey player 
Nestor Chylak – Major League Baseball umpire; member of National Baseball Hall of Fame
Gene Chyzowych – US National Soccer Team Coach and member of the National Soccer Coaches Association of America's Hall of Fame
Walt Chyzowych – US National Soccer Team Coach and member of the National Soccer Coaches Association of America's Hall of Fame
Sasha Cohen – Olympic silver medalist figure skater; Ukrainian Jewish on the maternal side
Bill Cristall – Major League Baseball player
Mike Ditka – NFL football player and coach; member of the Football Hall of Fame
Jim Drucker (born 1952/1953), former Commissioner of the Continental Basketball Association, former Commissioner of the Arena Football League, and founder of NewKadia Comics
Pete Emelianchik – NFL football player
Harry Fanok – Major League Baseball pitcher
Ruslan Fedotenko – Ukrainian-born NHL ice hockey player, US citizen
Jim Furyk – professional golfer
Yury Gelman (born 1955) - Ukrainian-born American Olympic fencing coach 
Sam Gerson – Ukrainian-born Olympic wrestler
Sloko Gill – NFL football player
Charles Goldenberg (1911–1986) – All-Pro NFL player
Alison Gregorka – Olympic water polo player
Wayne Gretzky – NHL ice hockey player of Ukrainian descent; US-Canadian dual citizen
Stephen Halaiko – professional boxer
Arnold Horween – NFL football player, of Jewish descent 
Ralph Horween – NFL football player, of Jewish descent 
Nick Itkin - Olympic bronze medalist fencer
Chris Jericho – AEW professional wrestler and frontman for Fozzy, mother is of Ukrainian descent
Kid Kaplan – boxer
Paul Konerko – Major League Baseball player
Steve Konowalchuk – NHL ice hockey player
Mike Kostiuk – NFL football player
Dima Kovalenko – Ukrainian-born American soccer player
Lenny Krayzelburg – Ukrainian-born Olympic swimmer
Matt Kuchar – professional golfer
Bob Kudelski – NHL ice hockey player
Denis Kudla – Ukrainian-born professional tennis player
Kyle Kuzma – NBA basketball player
Varvara Lepchenko – professional tennis player
Terry Liskevych – US Olympics Volleyball coach
Evan Longoria – Major League Baseball third baseman for the Tampa Bay Rays; of Ukrainian descent on maternal side
Daphne Martschenko – professional rower; Ukrainian father
Steve Melnyk – professional golfer
Charlie Metro – Major League Baseball player
Bronko Nagurski – NFL football player and professional wrestler; member of Football Hall of Fame
Bronko Nagurski Jr. – Canadian football player
Igor Olshansky – NFL football defensive end for the Miami Dolphins; born in Dnipropetrovsk, Ukraine
Greg Pateryn – NHL ice hockey player
Oleg Prudius – WWE professional wrestler known as "Vladimir Kozlov"
Steve Romanik – NFL football player
Dmitry Salita – Ukrainian-born American boxer; also called "Star of David"
Richard Sandrak – child bodybuilder
Flip Saunders – head coach for Detroit Pistons and coaches in the NBA
Richie Scheinblum – Major League Baseball All Star outfielder, of Jewish descent 
Andy Seminick – Major League Baseball player
Art Shamsky (born 1941) – Major League Baseball outfielder and Israel Baseball League manager, of Jewish descent
Mike Souchak – professional golfer
Eugene Starikov – Ukrainian-born American soccer player
Wally Szczerbiak – NBA basketball player
Brady Tkachuk – NHL player, son of Keith Tkachuk; Ukrainian descent on both sides
Keith Tkachuk – NHL ice hockey player of Ukrainian descent; US-born citizen
Matthew Tkachuk – NHL player, son of Keith Tkachuk; Ukrainian descent on both sides
 Phil Weintraub (1907–1987) – Major League Baseball first baseman & outfielder
Chuck Wepner – professional boxer
George Varoff – pole vaulter and former World Record holder
Ed Vargo – Major League Baseball umpire
Nikolai Volkoff – WWF professional wrestler
Smokey Yunick – NASCAR mechanic and car designer

Scientists and scholars 

 Gabriel Almond – professor of political science; founder of Princeton University's, Center of International Studies 
 Lev Dobriansky – professor of economics at Georgetown University; U.S. ambassador to the Bahamas; anti-communist advocate; known for work with the National Captive Nations Committee, which he initiated during the Eisenhower administration,  and the Victims of Communism Memorial Foundation, where he served as a chairman
 Theodosius Dobzhansky – geneticist and evolutionary biologist
 Katherine Esau – botanist 
 Alexei Filippenko – astrophysicist and professor of astronomy at the University of California, Berkeley; developed and runs the Katzman Automatic Imaging Telescope; ranked as the most cited researcher in space science 1996–2006; won the 2006 US Professor of the Year Award; elected to the National Academy of Sciences in 2009; frequently featured on the History Channel series The Universe
 Maria Fischer-Slyzh - doctor of pediatrics, philanthropist
 Maxwell Finland – scientist, medical researcher, an expert on infectious diseases
 Konstantin Frank – viticulturist and winemaker, responsible for developing the thriving viticulture and wine industry of New York State, using his experience of growing the Southern European Vitis vinifera varietals in the colder climate of Ukraine
 Milton Friedman – economist
 John-Paul Himka – professor of Ukrainian history
 Taras Hunczak – historian (Ph.D., professor) and media adviser; expert in East European history and languages
 Roman Jackiw – MIT professor of physics
 John Kanzius – inventor and radio/TV engineer
 George Kistiakowsky – physical chemistry professor, member of the Manhattan Project
 Lubomyr Kuzmak – pioneer within the bariatric surgery community, invented the adjustable gastric band
 Max Levchin – computer scientist and internet entrepreneur; co-founder (along with Peter Thiel and Elon Musk) and former chief technology officer of PayPal; founded a number of other technology companies, of Jewish descent. 
 Jane Lubchenco – environmental scientist and marine ecologist, head of the National Oceanic and Atmospheric Administration
 Sonja Lyubomirsky – professor in the Department of Psychology at the University of California, Riverside researching positive psychology and happiness, an associate editor of the Journal of Positive Psychology, and the author of The How of Happiness, a book of happiness strategies backed by scientific research
 Boris Magasanik – microbiologist and biochemist
 Greg Mankiw – macroeconomist; chairman and professor of economics at Harvard University; known in academia for his work on New Keynesian economics and publishing the best-selling economics textbook Principles of Economics; chairman 2003-2005 of the Council of Economic Advisers under President George W. Bush; his was ranked the number one economics blog by US economics professors in a 2011 survey;  elected a member of the American Academy of Arts and Sciences in 2007; with David Card, was elected vice president of the American Economic Association for 2014
 Bruce E. Melnick – Commander, USCG and NASA Astronaut
 Jeffrey Miron – economist and outspoken libertarian; chairman of the Department of Economics at Boston University 1992–1998; currently Senior Lecturer and Director of Undergraduate Studies at Harvard University's Economics Department
 Alexander J. Motyl – historian, Professor of Political Science at Rutgers University
 Anna Nagurney – mathematician, economist, educator and author in the field of Operations Management; holds the John F. Smith Memorial Professorship in the Isenberg School of Management at the University of Massachusetts Amherst
 Sherwin B. Nuland - scholar and author, father of Victoria Nuland
 Simon Ramo – physicist; Russian–Ukrainian
 Heidemarie Stefanyshyn-Piper – Captain, USN and NASA Astronaut
 George Shevelov – professor; Ukrainian linguist
 Frank Sysyn – professor of Ukrainian history
 Roman Szporluk – historian and political scientist; former director of the Harvard Ukrainian Research Institute
 Sergiy Vilkomir – computer scientist; associate professor at East Carolina University
 Eugene Volokh – law professor, the Gary T. Schwartz Professor of Law at the UCLA School of Law; an academic affiliate of the law firm Mayer Brown; publishes the blog "The Volokh Conspiracy" 
 Michael J. Yaremchuk – plastic surgeon
 Michael I. Yarymovych – Chief Scientist of the US Air Force and NASA Scientist
 Arnold Zellner – economist; statistician

Writers and journalists 
 Sy Bartlett – screenwriter and motion picture producer
 Kiran Chetry – former CNN anchor
 Jerry Cooke – photojournalist
 Maryna and Serhiy Dyachenko - Ukrainian fantasy fiction writers residing in the United States
 Richard Ellmann – literary critic and biographer
 Adrian Holovaty – journalist
Olena Kalytiak Davis – poet
Maria Kuznetsova – novelist
Mariya Livytska – writer
Lera Loeb – fashion blogger and publicist
Valya Dudycz Lupescu – writer
Dzvinia Orlowsky – poet, translator and professor
Evanka Osmak – sports anchor
 Chuck Palahniuk – transgressive fiction novelist and freelance journalist
Anna Politkovskaya – journalist, writer
Mike Royko – journalist (Ukrainian father)
Michael Smerconish – CNN host
Yuriy Tarnawsky – writer and linguist
Neale Donald Walsch – author

Other 
 Vitaly Borker, Internet criminal and cyberbully
 John Demjanjuk – retired auto worker/war crimes defendant
 Sky Metalwala – Seattle-area child missing since 2011; born to a Ukrainian immigrant mother.
 Semion Mogilevich – alleged "boss of bosses" of most Russian Mafia syndicates
 Jackie Stallone – astrologer and mother of Sylvester Stallone, maternal Jewish descent

See also
 List of Ukrainian Canadians

References

Americans
Ukrainian-Americans

Ukrainian Americans
Ukrainian